Susan Y. Schwartz is a scientist at the University of California, Santa Cruz known for her research on earthquakes, through field projects conducted in locations in Costa Rica and the San Andreas Fault.

Education and career 
Schwartz has an Sc.B. from Brown University (1981) and an M.S. (1983) and a Ph.D. (1988) from the University of Michigan. During her Ph.D., she worked on the occurrence of earthquakes in subduction zones, including the Solomon Islands, the 1968 Tokachi earthquake, and the southern Kuril Islands. At the University of California in Santa Cruz, Schwartz was first a postdoctoral fellow from 1988 until 1990, followed by four years as an assistant research seismologist, and then in 1994 she was hired as an assistant professor and was subsequently promoted to professor in 2002. 

In 2016 Schwartz was elected a fellow of the American Geophysical Union who cited her "for fundamental work that places subduction zone earthquakes in tectonic context".

Research 
Schwartz's research interests center on the mechanics of earthquakes in subduction zones and variations in earthquakes on regional scales. While at the University of Michigan, she worked on paleomagnetism in the Wyoming-Idaho region and the folding of the Appalachian Mountains. Her research has taken her to multiple field locations including the Southern Kurile Islands, New Zealand, and Costa Rica. Her research on the 2012 Costa Rica earthquake relied on instrumentation installed in the region prior to the earthquake which allowed her to define spatial variability in the fluids beneath the plate that impact the formation of earthquakes in the region. She has also examined the seismology of the 1971 Solomon Islands earthquakes. Schwartz was a postdoc working in California during the 1989 Loma Prieta earthquake and in 2014 she recalled her feelings during the day of the earthquake and her realization of the importance of the "human element" of her research in seismology.

Selected publications

Awards and honors 
 Fellow, American Geophysical Union (2016)

References

External links 
 

Fellows of the American Geophysical Union
Living people
Brown University alumni
University of Michigan alumni
University of California, Santa Cruz faculty
Seismologists
Women geologists
Year of birth missing (living people)
Place of birth missing (living people)
Nationality missing